Helminthoglypta is a genus of air-breathing land snails, terrestrial pulmonate gastropod mollusks in the subfamily Helminthoglyptinae of the family Xanthonychidae. 

Species within this genus of snails create and use love darts as part of their mating behavior.

Species
Species within the genus Helminthoglypta include:
 Helminthoglypta allynsmithi, Allyn Smith's banded snail
 Helminthoglypta arrosa (W.G. Binney, 1858)
 Helminthoglypta avus (Bartsch, 1916)
 Helminthoglypta ayresiana (Newcomb, 1861)
 Helminthoglypta benitoensis H.N. Lowe, 1930
 Helminthoglypta berryi Hanna, 1929
 † Helminthoglypta bozemanensis B. Roth, 1986
 Helminthoglypta californiensis (I. Lea, 1838)
 Helminthoglypta callistoderma  ((Pilsbry & Ferriss, 1919)), Kern shoulderband
 Helminthoglypta carpenteri (Newcomb, 1861)
 Helminthoglypta caruthersi Willett, 1934
 Helminthoglypta coelata (Bartsch, 1916), mesa shoulderband
 Helminthoglypta concolor B. Roth & Hochberg, 1988
 Helminthoglypta contracostae (Pilsbry, 1895)
 Helminthoglypta crotalina S.S. Berry, 1928
 Helminthoglypta cuyama Hanna & A.G. Smith, 1937
 Helminthoglypta cypreophila (W.G. Binney & Bland, 1869)
 Helminthoglypta diabloensis (J.G. Cooper, 1869)
 Helminthoglypta dupetithouarsii (Deshayes, 1840)
 Helminthoglypta edwardsi Gregg & W.B. Miller, 1976
 Helminthoglypta euomphalodes S.S. Berry, 1938
 Helminthoglypta exarata (L. Pfeiffer, 1857)
 Helminthoglypta expansilabris (Pilsbry, 1898)
 Helminthoglypta ferrissi Pilsbry, 1924
 Helminthoglypta fieldi Pilsbry, 1930
 Helminthoglypta fisheri (Bartsch, 1904)
 Helminthoglypta fontiphila Gregg, 1931
 Helminthoglypta graniticola S.S. Berry, 1926
 Helminthoglypta greggi Willett, 1931
 Helminthoglypta hannai Pilsbry, 1927
 Helminthoglypta hertleini Hanna & A.G. Smith, 1937
 Helminthoglypta inglesi S.S. Berry, 1938
 Helminthoglypta isabella S.S. Berry, 1938
 Helminthoglypta jaegeri S.S. Berry, 1928
 Helminthoglypta liodoma S.S. Berry, 1938
 Helminthoglypta mailliardi Pilsbry, 1926
 † Helminthoglypta martini (Hanna, 1920) 
 Helminthoglypta micrometalleoides W.B. Miller, 1970
 Helminthoglypta milleri Reeder, 1986
 Helminthoglypta misiona Chase, 1937
 Helminthoglypta mohaveana S.S. Berry, 1927, Victorville shoulderband
 Helminthoglypta montezuma Reeder & W.B. Miller, 1986
 Helminthoglypta morroensis (Hemphill, 1911), Chorro shoulderband
 Helminthoglypta nickliniana (I. Lea, 1838)
 Helminthoglypta orina S.S. Berry, 1938
 Helminthoglypta petricola (S.S. Berry, 1916)
 Helminthoglypta phlyctaena (Bartsch, 1916), Zaca shoulderband
 Helminthoglypta piutensis Willett, 1938
 Helminthoglypta proles (Hemphill in W.G. Binney, 1892)
 Helminthoglypta reederi W. B. Miller, 1981
 Helminthoglypta reediana Willett, 1932
 Helminthoglypta salviae B. Roth, 1987
 Helminthoglypta sanctaecrucis Pilsbry, 1927
 Helminthoglypta sequoicola (J.G. Cooper, 1866)
 Helminthoglypta similans Hanna & A. G. Smith, 1937
 Helminthoglypta sonoma Pilsbry, 1937
 Helminthoglypta stageri Willett, 1938
 Helminthoglypta stiversiana (J.G. Cooper, 1875)
 Helminthoglypta talmadgei B. Roth, 1988
 Helminthoglypta taylori Reeder & B. Roth, 1988
 Helminthoglypta tejonis S.S. Berry, 1930
 Helminthoglypta thermimontis S.S. Berry, 1953
 Helminthoglypta traskii (Newcomb, 1861)
 Helminthoglypta tudiculata (Binney, 1843)
 Helminthoglypta tularensis (Hemphill in W.G. Binney, 1892)
 Helminthoglypta umbilicata (Pilsbry, 1898)
 Helminthoglypta uvasana B. Roth & Hochberg, 1992
 Helminthoglypta vasquezi B. Roth & Hochberg, 1992
 Helminthoglypta venturensis (Bartsch, 1916)
 Helminthoglypta walkeriana (Hemphill, 1911), banded dune snail
 Helminthoglypta waltoni Gregg & W.B. Miller, 1976
 Helminthoglypta willetti (S.S. Berry, 1920)

References

 
Xanthonychidae
Taxa named by César Marie Félix Ancey
Taxonomy articles created by Polbot